Laurie Gloag (30 October 1925 – 28 February 1984) was a Scotland international rugby union player.

Rugby Union career

Amateur career

Laurie Gloag, along with his brother Ian, went to Oundle School.

He played for Middlesbrough.

He played rugby union for Cambridge University, when he went to university at Trinity College.

He joined Kelso in 1951. He was nominated for the vice-captaincy in early 1952 but declined as he expected to leave Kelso in October that year.

Provincial career

He started for the Scotland Possibles side in January 1949, but after a good performance in the first half was promoted to the Scotland Probables side in the second half.

When he joined Kelso, he then turned out for South of Scotland District.

International career

He was capped for Scotland 4 times, all in 1949. He scored one try, against Wales.

Cricket career

He played cricket for Kelso Cricket club.

Family

His father was Ernest Richardson Gloag (1885 - 1936) and his mother Olga Gjers Gjers (1895 - 1973).

They had sons Laurie and Ian Sadler Gloag. Ian also played rugby union for Middlesbrough, Cambridge University,  as well as the Royal Signals and Yorkshire.

Laurie Gloag married Anne Clinkard (1930 - 2018) in June 1962.

Death

He is buried in St. Botolph Churchyard in Carlton-in-Cleveland, North Yorkshire. Both his parents and brother are also buried there.

References

1925 births
1984 deaths
Scottish rugby union players
Scotland international rugby union players
Cambridge University R.U.F.C. players
Scotland Possibles players
Scotland Probables players
Kelso RFC players
South of Scotland District (rugby union) players
Middlesbrough RFC players